was a village located in Kitakanbara District, Niigata Prefecture, Japan. Kurokawa is now part of the newly created city of Tainai.

As of 2003, the village had an estimated population of 6,577 and a density of 36.42 persons per km². The total area was 180.60 km².

On September 1, 2005, Kurokawa, along with the town of Nakajō (also from Kitakanbara District), was merged to create the city of Tainai. Tainai City has a population of approximately 33,000.

External links

 Village of Kurokawa (Archive) 
 City of Tainai 

Dissolved municipalities of Niigata Prefecture
Tainai, Niigata